George Mathews may refer to:

George Mathews (soldier) (1739–1812), U.S. General and Governor of Georgia
George Mathews (judge) (1774–1836), Chief Justice of the Louisiana Supreme Court
George A. Mathews (1852–1941), Delegate from Dakota Territory to the United States House of Representatives
George G. Mathews Jr. (1855–1944), American diplomat and politician
George Ballard Mathews (1861–1922), English mathematician
George W. Mathews (1874–1906), Medal of Honor recipient
George C. Mathews (1886–1946), American economist
George Mathews (actor) (1911–1984), American actor

See also
Geevarghese Mor Coorilose or George Mathews Nalunnakkal (born 1965), Syriac Orthodox bishop
George Matthews (disambiguation)